John Broomhall is an English composer, audio producer/director, journalist and consultant, working mainly in the video game industry. During the 1990s, Broomhall worked with MicroProse/Spectrum HoloByte as their head of audio. He has played live jazz, blues, funk and gospel. In 2002, he set up Broomhall Projects Limited (BPL) "to provide a full range of audio services covering management, consultancy, content direction and production."

In 2009, he was honoured with a Recognition Award by the Game Audio Network Guild. He also chaired many BAFTA Audio Awards and sits on the BAFTA Video Games Committee.

Work

Games
Phoenix Point (2018) - music composer
Transport Tycoon Mobile (2014)
Forza Motorsport 5(2013)
New International Track & Field (2008)
Heavenly Sword (2007)
Go! Sudoku (2006)
B-Boy (2006)
Chris Sawyer's Locomotion (2004)
Grand Prix 4 (2002) 
Micro Machines (2002) 
Slam Tennis (2002)
Superman: Shadow of Apokolips (2002)
Frogger 2: Swampy's Revenge (2000)
Grand Prix 3 (2000) - audio producer
Em@il Games: X-COM (1999) - sound designer 
Grand Prix World (1999) - audio producer
MechWarrior 3 (1999) - music composer
Spirit of Speed 1937 (1999) - sound technician
X-COM: Apocalypse (1997) - music composer, sound designer 
Grand Prix Manager 2 (1996) - music composer, audio producer
Grand Prix 2 (1995) - music composer, sound designer 
Grand Prix Manager (1995) - audio producer 
Navy Strike (1995) - music composer
Sid Meier's Colonization (1995) - audio producer (Amiga)
Transport Tycoon Deluxe (1995) - music composer 
X-COM: Terror from the Deep (1995) - music composer (PC), audio producer
Transport Tycoon (1994) - music composer
X-COM: UFO Defense (1994) - music composer (PC), audio producer
Air Duel: 80 Years of Dogfighting (1993) - music composer (PC)
Fields of Glory (1993) - music composer
B-17 Flying Fortress (1992) - music composer
Harrier Jump Jet (1992) - music composer
The Legacy: Realm of Terror (1992) - music composer
Sid Meier's Civilization (1992) - music composer, sound designer (Amiga)
Formula One Grand Prix (1992) - music composer (PC)
David Leadbetter's Greens (1991) - music composer (PC)
Special Forces (1991)

Films
A Christmas Carol (2009)
Over the Hedge (2006)
Wallace & Gromit: The Curse of the Were-Rabbit (2005)

Other
American Idol/Pop Idol

References

External links

Year of birth missing (living people)
English composers
English male composers
Living people
Video game composers
Video game producers